Keilhau is a surname. Notable people with the surname include:

Carl Keilhau (1919–1957), Norwegian journalist and poet
Hans Vilhelm Keilhau (1845–1917), Norwegian artillery officer and politician
Louise Keilhau (1860–1927), Norwegian teacher and peace activist
Wilhelm Keilhau (1888–1954), Norwegian historian and economist
Wollert Keilhau (1894–1958), Norwegian librarian and encyclopedist